A pyropress is a lubrication pump used in diesel generators during the startup process. The pyropress lubricates the diesel generators before the startup process can be completed. Once a diesel generator has fully started and is operational, the pyropress is shut down automatically.

Operation

The pyropress is composed of two segments. The first is a pneumatic motor and the second is a hydraulic pump. The pneumatic pump powers the hydraulic pump by means of element coupling between the pump shafts. The hydraulic pump portion of the pyropress is a screw pump.

References

Diesel engine technology